The Ivatan language, also known as Chirin nu Ivatan ("language of the Ivatan people"), is a Philippine language of Austronesian origins spoken in the Batanes Islands of the Philippines.

Although the islands are closer to Taiwan than to Luzon, it is not one of the Formosan languages. Ivatan is one of the Batanic languages, which are perhaps a primary branch of the Malayo-Polynesian family of Austronesian languages.

The language of Babuyan Island (Ibatan) is sometimes classified as a dialect of the Ivatan language. Most of the Babuyan population moved to Batan Island and to Luzon mainland during the Spanish colonial period. The island became repopulated at the end of the 19th century with families from Batan, most of them speakers of one of the Ivatan dialects.

Introduction 
While related to the Northern Philippine group of languages, Ivatan, having been isolated, is most close to the two other members of the Bashiic sub-group of languages, Yami (Tao) and Itbayat, neither of which is indigenous to Luzon. Ibatan dialect, spoken on the nearby Babuyan group of islands, is so similar to Ivatan that it is not entirely clear whether it should be classified as a dialect of Ivatan or a separate language, though each does receive its own code in ISO taxonomy.

Ivatan has two dialects; Basco Ivatan, more commonly known as Ivasay, spoken on the main island of Batan, and Southern Ivatan or Isamurung, spoken on the southern half of Batan and on the most southern island, Sabtang.

Variations in language

In the capital of Basco and the surrounding northern half of Batan, the area encompassed by Ivasayen, t is prominent, whereas in the Isamurongen zone to the south (Mahatao, Ivana, Uyugan and Sabtang) that phoneme becomes a ch.

Examples of the more visible variations of the Ivasayen and Isamurongen words and pronunciations are:

Itbayaten is sometimes also considered a dialect.  2% of the total vocabulary does not occur in Ivatan dialects.  Examples of different Ivasayen, Isamurongen and Itbayaten words that have the same English translation:

Ivatan and Filipino words are sometimes combined, as in the Ivatan word . This is the result of the influence of non-Ivatans who tend to speak the language and were then eventually adopted.

These are results of shortening Ivatan phrases or sentences into one or two words, depending on usage.

Common Ivatan expressions have various origins such as:
  or Literally: 'God reward you with goodness' or 'God bless you'Usage: Used to show gratitude to someone
 Literally: 'May God remain with you'Usage: Used by the person who is leaving
 Literally: 'May God go with you'Usage: Used by the person who is staying behind

Phonology

Vowels [e] and [o] only occur in loanwords from Spanish, Ilocano, and Tagalog.

/h/ can also be heard as a velar fricative . Ivatan is one of the Philippine languages that do not exhibit []-[d] allophony.

Grammar

Pronouns
The following set of pronouns is found in the Ivatan language.

Cultural terms of the Ivatan people

Phrases

Ivatan words

Etymology
Coined words are two words combined to form one new word.

Similarities with other Philippine languages

Similarities with the Tao language

Accommodation

Approval and disapproval

Colors

Days of the week

Direction

Cardinal numbers

Writing system
Ivatan is written using the Latin alphabet. As Ivatan is primarily a spoken language and seldom used in written form, there is currently no consistent way of writing the language and different conventions may be used by different writers. An orthography devised for use in public schools by the Department of Education uses the full 26-letter Latin alphabet, with three extra letters, ch, ñ, and ng.

References

External links

 Ivatan Language Packet
 The Ivatan
 Affiliation with the Yami of Taiwan
 Bansa.org Ivatan Dictionary 
 Ivatan-English Dictionary from Webster's Dictionary
 IVATAN LANGUAGE: AN ANALYSIS – BatanesOnline.com
 Ivatan Language  of the Batales Islands
 Batanes: Ivatan Songs composed and / or collected by Manuel Fajardo
 Uyugan, Batanes! On the Web! Batanes

Batanic languages
Languages of Batanes
Languages of Cagayan